Lyman Lake petroglyphs is a site significant to North American Archaeology.  Located in Arizona, United States, in Lyman Lake State Park, the site exhibits traditional rock art or petroglyphs.

See also
 
 
 National Register of Historic Places listings in Apache County, Arizona

References

External links

Archaeological sites in Arizona